Serasa Bay is a bay in Brunei-Muara District, Brunei. The waters within the bay is calm but are noted to be polluted by industrial complexes, oil released from ships due to the close proximity of the Muara Port and sewage from sewage plants. Fish cages were used to capture fishes such as Red tilapia, Grouper and Barramundi.

In early 1988, gathering of water quality was done before the releasing of sewage from Muara Sewage Treatment Plant. It is also reported in 1989, Penaeus monodon and Penaeus setiferus were farmed in the bay.

References 

Bays of Brunei
Brunei-Muara District